Nethan Gorge is a natural gorge carved by the River Nethan, in South Lanarkshire, Scotland.

Geography
Nethan Gorge is split into two officially designated and actively protected Sites of Special Scientific Interest, Lower Nethan Gorge and Upper Nethan Gorge.

Both sites are referred to as nature reserves by the owner, the Scottish Wildlife Trust. They are also both contributing reserves to the Clyde Valley Woodlands National Nature Reserve.

Lower Nethan Gorge
The Lower Nethan Gorge reserve, near Lanark, is one of the best examples of semi-natural woodland still surviving in the Clyde Valley. Ash and elm woodlands grow on its steep slopes.

The gorge is home to many species of flora and fauna, including green woodpeckers, otters, and badgers.

Lower Nethan Gorge was declared a part of the Clyde Valley Woodlands National Nature Reserve in 2007.

Upper Nethan Gorge
The Upper Nethan Gorge reserve, near Blackwood and Lesmahagow, is part of the Clyde and Avon Valley Landscape Partnership and the Clyde Valley Woodlands National Nature Reserve.

The reserve's woodlands support a large range of species, including locally uncommon plants such as broad-leaved helleborine (Epipactis helleborine), wood melick (Melica uniflora), and meadow saxifrage (Saxifraga granulata).

Great spotted woodpeckers and buzzards can also be seen.

See also

References

External links
Scottish Wildlife Trust: official Lower Nethan Gorge website
Scottish Wildlife Trust: official Upper Nethan Gorge website

Canyons and gorges of Scotland
Clyde Valley Woodlands National Nature Reserve
Sites of Special Scientific Interest in Scotland